The Villa Kathrine is a Moroccan-style home located on the bluffs overlooking the Mississippi River in Quincy, Illinois. This home is the subject of a local lost treasure story as well as a ghostlore story featuring a dog.

History 
The unique home, sometimes branded as a castle, was built in 1900 by architect George Behrensmeyer for wealthy Quincy native W. George Metz. Metz had a fondness for Mediterranean architecture, and used the Villa Kathrine as his home when he was not venturing the world. Metz eventually sold the castle in 1912, and the site fell into disrepair and neglect before the non-profit Friends of the Castle sought to restore the Villa in 1978. Work on restoring the castle was completed in 1998, and appropriate site furnishings have been donated and obtained by staff throughout the years to further enhance the castle's Moroccan roots. Currently, the site functions as the official tourist information center to the City of Quincy and tours are granted of the site on an appointment basis.

Inside, the castle features a harem, a courtyard, and a reflecting pool. Much of the designs for the interior and exterior of the building were based upon W. George Metz's sketches of Islamic architecture that he observed during his global travels.

In 2010, the Villa Kathrine was used as a filming location in the Struber Productions film, Fang, which has yet to be released.

Legend 
According to local legend, Metz shared his travels with a woman he met in Germany and intended to bring her to Quincy. The woman, however refused to move into the lavish new home that Metz had commissioned, and Metz returned to the United States broken-hearted and alone. Another version of the story states that this mysterious woman died en route to Quincy. It was reported that Metz was not a total recluse after his heartbreak, as he was known throughout the community for hosting lavish parties at his home and dining with friends. But for twelve years, the only companion to share in his dream house was his 212-pound Great Dane named Bingo. Upon Bingo's death, Metz fell into a great depression and sold the house in 1912 at the request of his family. He ended up selling the Villa Kathrine to prospective occupants which were actually agents for the railroad industry. When word got out that they intended to demolish the site in favor of a railroad yard, vandals sacked the building and stole the furnishings. When Metz saw the neglect, he vowed never to return to the site again. He would later return to the castle with press and exclaim that he wished he still owned the site, so that he would tear it down.

Bingo, the dog, has been said to be haunting the building. Rumors have also circulated that Bingo was buried with a large cache of gold somewhere on the site, but the canine body has yet to be found.

References

External links 
 
 Quincy, Illinois Area Convention and Visitor's Bureau
 PBS Clip on the Villa Kathrine
 Illinois Adventure: Villa Kathrine

Houses completed in 1900
National Register of Historic Places in Adams County, Illinois
Architecture museums in the United States
Buildings and structures in Quincy, Illinois
Moorish Revival architecture in Illinois
Reportedly haunted locations in Illinois
Historic house museums in Illinois
Houses in Adams County, Illinois
Museums in Adams County, Illinois
Houses on the National Register of Historic Places in Illinois
Tourist attractions in Quincy, Illinois